Iros todos a tomar por culo (English: Fuck You All) is a live album by Spanish hard rock band Extremoduro. It was produced by Iñaki "Uoho" Antón and published by Dro Records in 1997.
It was recorded during the tour which promoted their album Agila, performed along with the band Platero y Tú.

Track listing

Personnel 
Extremoduro
 Roberto "Robe" Iniesta – Guitar and vocals
 Ramón "Mon" Sogas – Bass and backing vocals
 Alberto "Capi" Gil – Drums
 Iñaki "Milindris" Setién – Guitar
Platero y tú
 Iñaki "Uoho" Antón – Guitar
 Fito Cabrales – Backing vocals, percussion instrument and vocals
 Juantxu Olano – Bass
 Jesús García – Drums

Charts and certifications

Chart performance

Certifications

References

External links 
 Extremoduro official website (in Spanish)

1997 live albums
Extremoduro albums
Spanish-language live albums